Ten Museum Park is a residential skyscraper in Miami, Florida. It is located in northeastern Downtown, on Biscayne Bay along the west side of Biscayne Boulevard. It was designed by Chad Oppenheim of Oppenheim Architecture + Design. Completed in early 2007, it opened for residential occupancy in mid-2007. The building itself is designed to reflect the heat from the sun while still keeping warmth, and designed to withstand 140 mph winds. As of June 2020, it stood as the 22nd-tallest building in Miami.

Ten Museum Park contains 20,000 square feet (1,858 m²) of Class A office space, retail space on the lower floors, and residential condominium units, which occupy most of the space on the upper floors.

See also
List of tallest buildings in Miami
 Downtown Miami
 List of tallest buildings in Florida

External links 
 Ten Museum Park - Emporis
 Ten Museum Park - SkyscraperPage

Residential buildings completed in 2007
Residential skyscrapers in Miami
Residential condominiums in Miami
Skyscraper office buildings in Miami
2007 establishments in Florida